Mytella guyanensis is a species of saltwater clams, marine bivalve molluscs in the family Mytilidae, the mussels.

Description

Distribution
This species is present in Mexico, Brasil, Costa Rica, El Salvador, Australia, Tasmania, Macquarie Island, Jamaica, Panama, Peru and South Carolina.

References

 Huber M. (2015). Compendium of bivalves 2. Harxheim: ConchBooks. 907 pp.
 The Freshwater Mussels (Unionoida) of the World (and other less consequential bivalves)

Mytilidae